Prunus humilis is a species of bush cherry native to northern China. It is cultivated for its edible fruit. Chloroplast DNA sequencing has shown that its closest relative is Prunus dictyoneura, at least as far as chloroplasts are concerned.

References

External links
 

humilis
humilis
Flora of China
Taxa named by Alexander von Bunge